Ba'ja is a Neolithic village  north of Petra, Jordan. Like the nearby site of Basta, the settlement was built in c. , during the PPNB (Pre-Pottery Neolithic B) period.
It is one of the largest neolithic villages in the Jordan area.

Near the entrance to the site is Ba'ja I, an Islamic settlement with 2-3 layers of an older Nabataean settlement.

History
Little is known of the early inhabitants of the village, or to what people they belonged. The original name of the village is also unknown, while the current name of the site, applied to it by archaeologists, takes its name from the nearby mountain range. The earliest written record attesting to the inhabitants of the region wherein Ba'ja lies is taken from the old Hebrew canonical books. There, it describes a certain people known as Ḥorites who inhabited the general region, and who were later joined by the descendants of Esau, b. Iṣaac, b. Ibrāhīm, in the 2nd millennium BCE, who intermarried with them and, eventually, supplanted them. By the time of the 1st-century CE, the general region – which included Petra – had been settled by the Nabatæi.

Houses
The maximum usable settlement area of the hilltop settlement of Ba'ja, for which 600 inhabitants are assumed, was 1.2 to 1.5 hectares. For this reason, the houses were built up to the surrounding steep slopes (up to 45°) and close to each other. Many houses had more than one floor, with the floors connected by an internal staircase. The walls of the buildings were up to 4.20 meters thick. In addition, the houses usually had a basement and were often renovated, which also changed the settlement plan.

Numerous stone axes and stone bowls were ritually buried between the walls of the houses and under the floors. Human and animal remains were also found in the same context.

Ossuary
In a 0.6 m² room with the remains of a wall painting in fresco technique showing abstract motifs and geometric figures were the bones of three adults and nine small children in whom no diseases could be detected that led to their death. In the burials, which were not at the same time, the deceased was placed in the middle of the room and the bones from previous burials were pushed to the side. Although the tomb was disturbed in the Neolithic period, numerous artificial pearls, nine arrowheads, a broken flint dagger, a mother-of-pearl ring and another piece of mother-of-pearl jewelry have been found beneath the skull of a newborn. There was red ocher throughout the tomb, which caused the bones and finds to turn red. The analysis of the grave gave no indication of a special status of the buried. Presumably they are the deceased of a large family, whereby the many child skeletons could indicate a high infant mortality rate.

Social structure and economy
A shallow hierarchy is assumed for Ba'ja, with decisions made by consensus of the family heads. The existence of a village chief cannot be ruled out.

Within the settlement area, many sandstone rings from local production have been found, which appear throughout central Jordan in this period and may have been an object of barter, which may indicate a certain wealth of the place. Since such stone rings and their precursor products were found in all households, it can be assumed that their production was organized within families.

Food production was mainly through livestock husbandry and hunting, with furs from leopards, foxes and the hyrax (Heterohyrax brucei) also being numerous.

References

Further reading
 Hans Georg K. Gebel, J. M. Starck: Investigations into the stone age of the Petra area (Early Holocene research). A preliminary report on the 1984 campaigns. Annual of the Department of Antiquities of Jordan 29, 1985, S. 89–114
 Hans Georg K. Gebel: Die Jungsteinzeit im Petra-Gebiet. In: M. Lindner (Hrsg.): Petra. Neue Ausgrabungen und Entdeckungen. Delp, München/Bad Windsheim 1986, S. 273–308
 Hans Georg K. Gebel, Hans-Dieter Bienert: The 1997 Season at Ba'ja, Southern Jordan. Neo-Lithics 3/97, ex oriente, Berlin 1997, S. 14–18
 Hans Georg K. Gebel, Hans-Dieter Bienert: Ba'ja hidden in the Petra Mountains. Preliminary results of the 1997 investigations. In: H. G. K. Gebel, Z. Kafafi, G. O. Rollefson (Hrsg.): The Prehistory of Jordan, II. Perspectives from 1997. Studies in Early Near Eastern Production, Subsistence, and Environment 4, ex oriente, Berlin 1997, S. 221–262.
 Hans Georg K. Gebel, Bo Dahl Hermansen: Ba'ja hidden in the Petra Mountains, II. Preliminary results of the 1999–2000 investigations. In: H.-D. Bienert, H. G. K. Gebel, R. Neef (Hrsg.): Central Settlements in Neolithic Jordan. Studies in Early Near Eastern Production, Subsistence, and Environment 5. ex oriente, Berlin 2004
 Hans-Dieter Bienert, Roland Lamprichs, Dieter Vieweger: Ba'ja. Archäologie einer Landschaft in Jordanien. Bericht über archäologische Feldforschungen. In: R. Eichmann (Hrsg.): Ausgrabungen und Surveys im Vorderen Orient. I Orient-Archäologie 5, M. Leideck, Rahden, 2002, S. 159–214

External links
 DW Documentary, October 2022. The Neolithic village of Ba'ja in Jordan, a famous archaeological site and one of the world's first known settlements.

Populated places established in the 7th millennium BC
Ain Ghazal
Former populated places in Jordan
Neolithic settlements
7th-millennium BC establishments
Pre-Pottery Neolithic B